Isle of Man competed in the 2014 Commonwealth Games in Glasgow, Scotland from 23 July to 3 August 2014.

Athletics

Men

Women

Cycling

Mountain biking

Road
Men

Women

Track
Points race

Scratch race

Gymnastics

Artistic
Men

Women

Individual all around final

Shooting

Men
Pistol/Small bore

Shotgun

Women
Pistol/Small bore

Swimming

Men

Women

Triathlon

References

Nations at the 2014 Commonwealth Games
Isle of Man at the Commonwealth Games
Com